The Kex Gill Bypass is a future stretch of A-road across Kex Gill Moor to Blubberhouses in North Yorkshire, England. The route is part of the A59 road across the Pennines between Preston and York, with the Kex Gill Bypass being located within the Nidderdale Area of Outstanding Natural Beauty. The bypass is required as the 1820s built bypass is prone to landslips and road cracking, which accounted for eight weeks of closure in 2016.

History
The original road past Blubberhouses and over Kex Moor went slightly further north than the current route known as Kex Gill. This road is now called Hall Lane at Blubberhouses and becomes a dirt track on the northern side of the valley carrying Hall Beck. This road was developed as a turnpike between 1770 and 1778 (The Skipton and Knaresborough Turnpike), but between 1823 and 1827, the new cut from Blubberhouses to Kex Gill Moor (the present A59) was built, which despite the name of the adjacent stream, became known as Kex Gill (or Kex Ghyll). The underlying geology is Kinderscout Grit, which has formed into several outcrops on the northern side of Kex Gill, including one called The Dovestone. It is thought that parts of the Craven faults in the area, dislodged the strata and allowed water to carve a "rocky gorge". The road became well-known when it was re-christened Cote de Blubberhouses in the 2014 Grand Depart Tour de France held in Yorkshire.

The road has suffered from many landslips and cracks as the southern edge of the small valley pushes down upon it. It was estimated that between 2008 and 2017, North Yorkshire County Council (NYCC) spent £1.6 million on remediating landslips and cracks. During the 2007 floods, the road was closed for a week after a landslip trapped a couple in the car. The landslide dislodged  of earth which slid down the embankment. In 2014, over £200,000 was spent on remedial works when heavy rain caused a landslip. In 2016, the road was closed for eight weeks to allow remedial work to be undertaken on the road which had moved  due to heavy rain over the preceding Christmas period.
The road was further restricted for nearly a year from May 2018.

The proposed bypass was subject to extra planning due to it being located within the Nidderdale Area of Outstanding Natural Beauty (AONB). In January 2022, North Yorkshire County Council announced its intention to proceed with the project as soon as possible. NYCC acknowledged that delays had been incurred by the "statutory processes" it needed to fulfil before the bypass could get underway. The project was costed at £60 million in January 2021; with £56 million from the Department for Transport (DfT) and the rest from NYCC. A revised junction at Church Hill (adjacent to Fewston Reservoir), is also part of the scheme to improve safety at that location.

In August 2022, the County Council provided another £7.2 million towards the scheme, with a new projected completion date in 2025. North Yorkshire County Council deputy leader Gareth Dadd, stated "I wouldn't say I'm pleased to be having to recommend a further £7.2m for the Kex Gill project. But nonetheless it shows our commitment to major road improvement." Clearance of the moorland along the route of the new road is expected to start in December 2022, to avoid the nesting season in the following spring.

Notes

References

Sources

External links
Proposed route diagram
British Geological Survey Landslide webpage about Kex Gill

Bypasses
Roads in Yorkshire